The VIA APC is a low-cost ($49) single-board computer from VIA Technologies designed to run the Android operating system. It has been available for purchase since July 2012. Since January 2013 enhanced versions are available for purchase at a higher price.

The APC Paper version, housed in a recycled cardboard case resembling a book, won a Design and Innovation Award at Computex 2013.

Technical details

See also

References

External links

VIA Technologies
Single-board computers
Linux-based devices